Anna Eliza Brydges  Gamon, formerly Elletson (1737-1823) was an English aristocrat and plantation owner. She married James Brydges, the third Duke of Chandos.

Early life

Anna came from Datchworth, Hertfordshire. She was the daughter of Richard Gamon and his wife, Elizabeth (née Grace). She had a younger brother, Sir Richard Grace Gamon, who became MP for Winchester.

First marriage and the Hope Plantation
Her first husband was Roger Hope Elletson (1723-1775), an Old Etonian who grew sugar on Jamaica and who also served as Lieutenant Governor of the island. 

Elletson died in England in 1775, leaving Anna the Hope Plantation near Kingston and the enslaved people who worked it. She was an absentee manager of the plantation into the 1780s, by which time she was joint owner with her second husband. The property passed to Anne, Anna's daughter by her second marriage and still belonged to the family in 1833 when slavery was abolished. The "Chandos inheritance" received by Anna's grandson Richard included £6,630 compensation for the loss of the slaves on the estate. This was awarded to the trustees of his marriage settlement.

Later life
She married the 3rd Duke of Chandos in 1777. This was a second marriage for both parties. They had one child who survived to adulthood, Lady Anne Elizabeth Brydges (born 1779).

In 1789, the Duke died from injuries received when his wife inadvertently moved the chair he was about to sit in. In 1791, Anna was declared a lunatic and confined to her London home, Chandos House. 

A lengthy lawsuit in the Irish courts over the management of her property ended dramatically in 1794 with the suicide of the judge Richard Power, accountant-general of the Court of Chancery, who was accused of misappropriation of funds connected  with the suit.

Media interest
In 2015, Anna's ownership of a sugar plantation was discussed in a television programme, Britain's Forgotten Slave-owners, broadcast by the BBC. The programme was presented by the historian David Olusoga who was filmed at Chandos House. It won a BAFTA award and the Royal Historical Society Public History Prize Winner for Broadcasting.

Notes
1. Anne Elizabeth married Richard Temple-Grenville, 1st Duke of Buckingham and Chandos. They were the parents of Richard Temple-Nugent-Brydges-Chandos-Grenville, 2nd Duke of Buckingham and Chandos.

References

1737 births
1823 deaths
English duchesses by marriage
British slave owners
Women slave owners
Jamaican planters
18th-century Jamaican people